is a Japanese manga series written and illustrated by Hideki Arai. It was serialized in Shogakukan's seinen manga magazine Big Comic Superior from 2001 to 2006, with its chapters collected in nine tankōbon volumes. It tells the story of Kiichi's life beginning at the age of three. A sequel, titled Kiichi VS, was serialized in the same magazine from August 2007 to July 2013, with its chapters collected in eleven tankōbon volumes.

Story
The series begins with Kiichi, aged three, and living with his parents. In the second volume they are killed, and he runs away from home. After living with some homeless people for a while, he ends up surviving in the woods by himself for nearly a year before being returned to his grandparents.

The second arc of the story begins with Kiichi in fifth grade, teaming up with a much more verbal and intelligent friend. They attempt to save a girl from classroom bullies, and then discover her father is forcing her to work as a prostitute. Political pressure keeps the police from doing anything about it, and they are forced to stage a hostage crisis in front of the capitol building to gain media attention.

Kiichi VS takes place ten years later, and finds Kiichi running a large organization dedicated to improving the world.

Publication
Written and illustrated by Hideki Arai, Kiichi!! was serialized in Shogakukan's seinen manga magazine Big Comic Superior from 2001 to 2006. Shogakukan collected its chapters in nine tankōbon volumes, released from January 30, 2002, to May 30, 2006.

A sequel to the series, titled , was serialized in Big Comic Superior from August 10, 2007, to July 12, 2013. Shogakukan collected its chapters in eleven tankōbon volumes, released from April 26, 2008, to August 30, 2013.

Volume list

Kiichi!!

Kiichi VS

Legacy
Manga author Tatsuki Fujimoto commented the influence that Arai's Kiichi!! and The World Is Mine had on his manga series Fire Punch.

References

Further reading

External links
 
 

Seinen manga
Shogakukan manga